Ender Aygören (born 16 June 2000) is a Turkish footballer who plays as a midfielder for Dıyarbakırspor on loan from Ankaragücü.

Professional career
Aygören made his debut with Ankaragücü in a 5-0 Süper Lig loss to Alanyaspor on 30 November 2019.

In 2021, he was loaned away to Iğdır FK.

References

External links
 

Living people
2000 births
People from Uşak
Turkish footballers
Association football midfielders
MKE Ankaragücü footballers
Ankara Demirspor footballers
Süper Lig players
TFF Second League players
TFF Third League players